Llandudno Ladies Football Club are a Welsh women's association football club based in Llandudno Junction, Conwy County Borough. They currently play their home games at Maes Du and play in the North Wales Women's Football League.

History
Llandudno Ladies were founded as Llandudno Junction Ladies as they were affiliated to men's team Llandudno Junction. In 2010, Llandudno Junction were promoted into the Welsh Premier Women's League however they only lasted one season before being relegated. In 2012, they were promoted back to the Welsh Premier Women's Football League due to the league expanding to twelve teams and becoming a fully national league. In their debut season back in top flight, Llandudno set a Welsh record for the most goals scored in a top flight game in Wales by winning 23–0 against Caerphilly Castle F.C. In 2013, they adopted the name of MBi Llandudno Ladies due to sponsorship. This was dropped in 2016 and the team name reverted to Llandudno Ladies.

In 2014, Llandudno Ladies moved to Maesdu Park due to changes in Welsh Premier Women's Football League's ground criteria and a new 3G pitch being installed. In 2016, Llandudno Ladies reached  the FAW Women's Cup final against Cardiff City Ladies F.C. aiming to become the first North Wales team to win it since Bangor F.C. in 2002.

Following the demise of Wrexham Ladies F.C., Llandudno Ladies and Rhyl & Prestatyn Ladies F.C. were the only clubs from North Wales remaining in the Welsh Premier Women's Football League until the 2019-20 season.

Llandundo Ladies began the 2019-20 season in the Welsh Women's Premier League, but withdrew in December 2019 citing a difficulty in recruiting and retaining players. Their resignation request was accepted and as such their playing record in the 2019-20 season was expunged.

Current squad 
.

References

External links 
 

Women's football clubs in Wales